Tucker Stadium is a 16,500-seat multi-purpose stadium in Cookeville, Tennessee. It is home to the Tennessee Technological University Golden Eagles team, and is named for former coach Wilburn Tucker (1920–1980).  The football field is named Overall Field in honor of former coach and administrator P. V. Overall. The stadium opened in 1966 and currently seats 16,500.

Tucker Stadium has hosted the TSSAA high school football state championships since 2009.

History

Renovations
In 2007, Tucker Stadium received upgrades to its playing field with the installation of artificial turf, as well as renovations and a new surface to the nine-lane track.

In 2008, an upgraded lighting system was added to the stadium.

In 2009, additional facility upgrades were performed on the press box.

On August 21, 2017, Tennessee Technological University hosted a solar eclipse viewing party at Tucker Stadium, to view a solar eclipse which was viewable in totality on this day.

Prior to the 2018 football season, a new, large video scoreboard was installed.

See also
 List of NCAA Division I FCS football stadiums

References

External links
 Tennessee Tech Golden Eagles - Tucker Stadium

College football venues
Tennessee Tech Golden Eagles football
Buildings and structures in Putnam County, Tennessee
American football venues in Tennessee
Multi-purpose stadiums in the United States
1966 establishments in Tennessee
Sports venues completed in 1966